The People's Park is a park in Halifax, West Yorkshire, England. It was given to the people of Halifax in 1857 by local carpet manufacturer Sir Francis Crossley.

The park was originally designed by Joseph Paxton, but suffering neglect in the late 20th century until a major restoration project which started in 1995. It is listed as Grade II* in the Register of Historic Parks and Gardens of special historic interest in England, and the Crossley Pavilion, a building in the park, is a Grade II* listed building.

Crossley had reportedly been impressed by the beauty of the scenery of New England on a visit and returned to Halifax eager "to arrange art and nature so that they shall be within the walk of every working man in Halifax; that he shall go to take his stroll there after he has done his hard day's toil, and be able to get home without being tired".

See also
Listed buildings in Halifax, West Yorkshire

References

External links

 Discussion of safety issues around the park's pond during restoration

Parks and open spaces in West Yorkshire
Tourist attractions in Calderdale
Buildings and structures in Halifax, West Yorkshire
Grade II* listed parks and gardens in West Yorkshire